Boško Đokić (26 October 1953 – 26 January 2019) was a Serbian professional basketball coach and journalist.

Coaching career
Đokić coached teams in Croatia, Serbia, Slovenia, Montenegro and Russia.

Between August and November 2005, Đokić coached Avala Ada.

Personal life 
Đokić was a columnist for Serbian daily newspaper Danas after 2011. As a journalist, he worked for Studio B, Večernje novosti, Sport, Koš and the Trener magazine.

Đokić and his wife Mirjana had a daughter, Milena.

Đokić died on 26 January 2019 in Belgrade, Serbia.

Career achievements
 Adriatic League champion: 1  (with Reflex: 2003–04 )
 Radivoj Korać Cup winner: 1  (with Reflex: 2004–05)
 Serbian League Cup winner: 1 (with Radnički Basket: 2009–10)

See also 
 List of ABA League-winning coaches
 List of Radivoj Korać Cup-winning head coaches

References

External links
Profile at eurobasket.com

1953 births
2019 deaths
ABA League-winning coaches
KK Avala Ada coaches
KK BASK coaches
KK BFC coaches
KK FMP coaches
KK FMP (1991–2011) coaches
KK Kolubara coaches
KK Lions/Swisslion Vršac coaches
KK Mašinac coaches
KK Mega Basket coaches
KK Metalac coaches
KK Napredak Aleksinac coaches
KK Napredak Kruševac coaches
KK Profikolor coaches
KK Sloga coaches
KK Sutjeska coaches
KK Vojvodina coaches
KK Zdravlje coaches
OKK Konstantin coaches
OKK Kikinda coaches
OKK Novi Pazar coaches
BKK Radnički coaches
Serbian columnists
Serbian men's basketball coaches
Serbian expatriate basketball people in Croatia
Serbian expatriate basketball people in Montenegro
Serbian expatriate basketball people in Russia
Serbian expatriate basketball people in Slovenia
Sportspeople from Belgrade